House of Gao may refer to:

Rulers of Northern Qi (550–577)
Rulers of Jingnan (924–963)
Rulers of Chiefdom of Yao'an (1147–1729)